Kam Shur (also Romanized as Kam Shūr) is a village in Poshtdarband Rural District, in the Central District of Kermanshah County, Kermanshah Province, Iran. At the 2006 census, its population was 354, in 93 families.

References 

Populated places in Kermanshah County